Markvartice is a municipality and village in Jičín District in the Hradec Králové Region of the Czech Republic. It has about 500 inhabitants.

Administrative parts
Villages and hamlets of Hřmenín, Leština, Mrkvojedy, Netolice, Příchvoj, Rakov, Skuřina and Spařence are administrative parts of Markvartice.

References

Villages in Jičín District